Andrew Wills (born 3 January 1972) is a former Australian rules footballer in the Australian Football League.

Wills was a character of the game, noticeable due to his clean shaven head, and played mostly on the wing or half forward. He played for the Geelong Football Club, the Fremantle Football Club and the Western Bulldogs. Wills was selected to play in the 1992 and 1994 AFL Grand Finals for Geelong Football Club.

External links

Geelong Football Club players
Fremantle Football Club players
Western Bulldogs players
Barwon Football Club players
Australian rules footballers from Victoria (Australia)
1972 births
Living people
People from Warragul
East Fremantle Football Club players
Subiaco Football Club players